The Liberal Democratic Party (PLD), also known as the Liberal Democrats (LD) was a political party led by Manuel García Prieto which split from the Liberal Party in 1913, shortly after the assassination of Prime Minister José Canalejas. The Liberal Democrats eventually went on to become the dominant liberal faction in the later stages of Restoration Spain.

The party was disestablished in 1923 after Miguel Primo de Rivera's coup.

References

Liberal Party (Spain, 1880)
Defunct political parties in Spain
Political parties established in 1913
Political parties disestablished in 1923
1913 establishments in Spain
1923 disestablishments in Spain
Restoration (Spain)